Joshua Ives Hammer is an American content creator and foreign freelance correspondent and bureau chief for Newsweek and in Europe. He has also written several books, including the best-selling The Bad-Ass Librarians of Timbuktu in 2016.

Early life and education
Hammer was born to a Jewish family and attended the Horace Mann School in Riverdale section of The Bronx. He obtained his B.A  in English Literature from Princeton University in 1979 where he was Cum Laude.

Career
Hammer has worked as a foreign correspondent.

While at Newsweek he was the Nairobi Bureau Chief from 1993 to 1996, the South American Bureau Chief from 1996–1997, the Los Angeles Bureau Chief from 1997–2001, the Berlin Bureau Chief from 2000–2001, and the Jerusalem Bureau Chief.

His articles have appeared in such publications as The New York Review of Books, The New Yorker and Smithsonian.

Personal life
Hammer and the photographer Gary Knight were kidnapped in the Gaza Strip in 2001.

Hammer has three sons and as of 2013 was residing with his family in Berlin, Germany.

Bibliography

Books
 
 
 Yokohama Burning: The Deadly 1923 Earthquake and Fire that Helped Forge the Path to World War II, 2006
 The Bad-Ass Librarians of Timbuktu, 2016
 The Falcon Thief: A True Tale of Adventure, Treachery, and the Hunt for the Perfect Bird, 2020

Articles
 
 
 
"How do You Solve a Problem Like Amazon?" American Affairs (August 2021)

References

Further reading
 Book review.
 Review of Chosen by God.
Hammer, Joshua 1957- Contemporary Authors, New Revision Series entry at Encyclopedia.com

External links
 
 Hammer, Joshua. "A Mountain of Trouble." Outside Online, May 2010.

1957 births
Living people
20th-century American journalists
American male journalists
The Atlantic (magazine) people
Jewish American writers
The New Yorker people
Smithsonian (magazine) people
Writers on the Middle East
21st-century American Jews